Idertia is a monotypic genus of flowering plants belonging to the family Ochnaceae. The only species is Idertia axillaris.

Its native range is Western Tropical Africa to Uganda.

References

Ochnaceae
Monotypic Malpighiales genera